Damoh Lok Sabha constituency is one of the 29 Lok Sabha constituencies in Madhya Pradesh state in central India. This constituency came into existence in 1962. It covers the entire Damoh district and parts of Sagar and Chhatarpur districts.

Assembly segments
Presently, Damoh Lok Sabha constituency comprises the following eight Vidhan Sabha (legislative assembly) segments:

Members of Parliament

Election results

General Elections 2019

General Elections 2014

General Elections 2009

See also
 Damoh district
 List of Constituencies of the Lok Sabha

References

External links
Damoh lok sabha  constituency election 2019 result details

Lok Sabha constituencies in Madhya Pradesh
Damoh district